Hex is the debut studio album by English anarcho-punk band Poison Girls, released in 1979 by record label Small Wonder. In a 2016 retrospective article following the death of Vi Subversa, The Independent considered the album "essentially one song". Trouser Press found the album to make "no grand statements" but liked "the guitar-based music".

Track listing
Words and music by the Poison Girls
"Old Tarts Song"– 2:21
"Crisis"– 3:26
"Idealogically Unsound"– 2:40
"Bremen Song"– 7:15
"Political Love"– 2:31
"Jump Mama Jump"– 3:03
"Under the Doctor"– 2:49
"Reality Attack"– 5:25

Personnel
Poison Girls
Vi Subversa - guitar, vocals
Richard Famous - guitar, vocals
Bernhardt Rebours - bass
Lance D'Boyle - drums
with:
Eve Libertine - additional vocals
Technical
John Loder - sound engineer
Bernhardt Rebours - sleeve design

References

External links 

 

1979 albums
Poison Girls albums